Letting Go or The Letting Go may refer to:

Music

Albums 
 Letting Go (Earshot album), 2002
 Letting Go (Jennifer Knapp album), 2010
 Letting Go (EP), by Lo-Pro, 2009
 The Letting Go, by Bonnie 'Prince' Billy, 2006
 Letting Go, by Jennylyn Mercado, 2006

Songs 
 "Letting Go" (Suzy Bogguss song)
 "Letting Go" (Wings song)
 "Letting Go (Cry Just a Little)", a song by Qwote
 "Letting Go (Dutty Love)", a song by Sean Kingston
 "Letting Go", by Barbra Streisand from Guilty Pleasures
 "Letting Go", by Mayday Parade from Black Lines
 "Letting Go", by Seal from Seal 6: Commitment
 "Letting Go", by Jeremy Camp from Restored
 "Letting Go", by Straight Lines, a Canadian band from the 1980's.

Other media 
 Letting Go (novel), a 1962 novel by Philip Roth
 "Letting Go" (Body of Proof), an episode of Body of Proof
 Letting Go, a 1985 TV movie starring John Ritter

See also 
 Let Go (disambiguation)